Mike Brown (born 4 September 1985) is an English professional rugby union player who plays fullback or wing for Leicester Tigers in Premiership Rugby. Brown joined the Harlequins senior team in 2005, having played youth rugby at Salisbury and Melksham, and began playing for the England first team two years later. Between 2021–2022 Brown played a season for Newcastle Falcons.

During his career, he has won 3 Six Nations Championship titles with England and two Premiership Rugby titles with Harlequins.

Early life
Born in Southampton, he was educated at Wyvern College, until aged 15 when he moved to Peter Symonds College. Having mainly played football and little rugby, he initially wanted to play fly half. Under the coaching of Mike Marchant, he changed position to fullback. This brought him to the attention of Salisbury RFC, where he moved to age 18, before a short stint at Melksham RFC.

Brown played with Melksham for one season, where his dad was a coach. He has cited his time at Melksham as one of his most enjoyable seasons playing rugby and as having contributed significantly to his maturing as a player. He gives significant praise to one individual mentor, Bobby Walsh, whom he credits for setting his standards on nutrition and conditioning.

Club career
Brown made his debut for Harlequins during the 2005/06 season, scoring a try on debut in a pre-season friendly against London Irish on 12 August 2005. He was part of the England Under 21 team that won the 2006 Six Nations Grand Slam and also competed in the Under 21 World Championships later that year. Brown was discovered  by Welsh rugby scout Craig Presdee-Salathiel, who contacted his friend Harlequins chairman David Morgan regarding Brown.

In the 2006–07 season, although still in a part of Harlequins' Academy side, he established himself as first choice full back. A standout season by Brown resulted in him collecting 9 tries, earning him a place on the Sky Sports Dream Team.

Brown had a successful 2010–11 season with Quins, culminating in winning the Amlin Challenge cup, beating Munster at Thomand Park on the way to the final against Stade Francais. This form continued into the 2011/12 Aviva Premiership season, resulting in a call up to the EPS squad. He started for Harlequins in their 2011–12 Premiership final victory over Leicester Tigers.

At the start of the 2019/2020 season, while still an active player, one of the bars at Harlequins’ home ground (The Stoop) was renamed in Brown’s honour.

On 4 April 2021, it was confirmed that after 16 years with the club, Brown would officially leave Harlequins and join Newcastle Falcons on a two-year deal ahead of the 2021–22 season.

In January of 2023 he signed a short-term contract with Leicester Tigers. He made his debut on 19 February 2023, scoring a try in a 24–18 win against Saracens.

International career
In the 2006–07 season, although still in a part of Harlequins' Academy side, he was capped by the England Saxons in the first two matches of the year.

Brown got selected for the 2007 England rugby union tour of South Africa. Unaffected by a severe incidence of food poisoning within the England camp, Brown picked up his first full England cap in the record 58–10 defeat to South Africa. Brown was called into the England Saxons side that defeated Ireland A on 1 February 2008. On 1 June 2008, he started for England against the Barbarians at Twickenham in an uncapped match. On 14 June 2008, he started for England in their 37–20 defeat to New Zealand.

Brown vied with Ben Foden for the England full-back spot in 2012, coming off the bench in the victory over Scotland at Murrayfield. He spent the 2013 Six Nations playing on the left wing with Alex Goode taking the number 15 jersey. He was finally picked at fullback by Stuart Lancaster and was subsequently named England's Man of the Series following his form during the 2013 Autumn Internationals. Brown scored his first try for England in the 2014 Six Nations Championship match against France on 1 February 2014 and his second came a week later in a comprehensive 20–0 victory against Scotland. He then scored two tries and was named Man of the Match for the third time in the tournament in the 52–11 away win over Italy in Rome. In recognition of Brown's form throughout the 2014 Six Nations Championship, he was selected by the general public for the 2014 RBS Six Nations player of the championship award.

Brown was an integral part of the England team that won the RBS Six Nations Championship in 2016 and played every match in the 3 - 0 series winover Australia.

Brown was named Man of the Match in the England vs Wales' Six Nations game on 10 February 2018.

International tries

Personal life
Brown married long term partner, Eliza Scarlett Woodcock, the daughter of former England international footballer Tony Woodcock, in summer 2016.

References

External links
Harlequins profile
England profile
ESPN profile

1985 births
Living people
England international rugby union players
English rugby union players
Harlequin F.C. players
Leicester Tigers players
Newcastle Falcons players
People educated at Peter Symonds College
Rugby union fullbacks
Rugby union players from Southampton